Evergestis plumbofascialis is a species of moth in the family Crambidae. It is found in Spain.

References

Moths described in 1894
Evergestis
Moths of Europe